The Northern Cyprus national football team represents Northern Cyprus, a de facto country, in association football. They were a member of the New Federations Board for non-FIFA-affiliated nations, until its dissolution in 2013. Northern Cyprus' home stadium is Nicosia Atatürk Stadium in North Nicosia and their head coach is Fırat Canova. They are the current FIFI Wild Cup champions, having won the event in Germany in June 2006. They are also the current ELF Cup champions, having won the event at home in November 2006.

Due to an ongoing sports embargo against Northern Cyprus, the team cannot play international matches with FIFA members.

History

Origins (1955–1962)
The Cyprus Turkish Football Federation (KTFF) was formed as early as 1955 – a consequence of Turkish Cypriot clubs withdrawing from playing in Cypriot sport competitions. Turkish Cypriots first played with a representative national side in 1962, against Turkey. This was before the 1974 war which caused the de facto partition of Cyprus and - as such - participating players were Turkish speakers from all over Cyprus.

Islamic Games (1980)
Despite not being considered an independent country, Northern Cyprus played in the 1980 Islamic Games football tournament, which was held in Izmir, Turkey. They suffered a 5–0 defeat against Turkey, their worst to date. Other results were a 2–0 loss against Saudi Arabia, 2–1 victory against Malaysia, and a 1–1 tie with Libya.

Reportedly, these matches were tolerated by FIFA as a result of an agreement with then-FIFA General Secretary Helmut Käser. After Northern Cyprus declared itself independent in 1983, this deal came to an end, leaving the Northern Cypriot team unable to play against FIFA-affiliated countries.

After the foundation of TRNC (1983–2004)

After the foundation of the Turkish Republic of Northern Cyprus in 1983, the KTFF hosted Sport Games Football Federation in 1999, winning the event.

NF-Board (2004–2013)

KTFF joined the NF-Board in 2004, expanding the horizons of the national team. KTFF hosted the KTFF 50th Anniversary Cup in 2005, winning the event. Turkish Republic of Northern Cyprus won the first NF-Board tournament, the FIFI Wild Cup, in Hamburg, Germany in June 2006 after defeating Zanzibar 4–1 on penalties after a goalless draw. KTFF was set to host the VIVA World Cup during November 2006, however due to issues between the sides the KTFF chose to host its own tournament, the ELF Cup at that time. Turkish Republic of Northern Cyprus opened the tournament against Crimea, winning 5–0, beating their previous 'largest win' record of 6–2 against Sápmi. Soon after the opener, they beat the new record with a 10–0 victory against Tibet.

Turkish Republic of Northern Cyprus defeated Crimea 3–1 in the ELF Cup finals to lift their second NF-Board cup in the same year.  On the 9th of January, Northern Cyprus was chosen to participate in the 2016 ConIFA World Football Cup

CONIFA (2013–present)

Tournament history
Turkish Republic of Northern Cyprus have taken part in five international tournaments and won four. KTFF 50th Anniversary Cup, organised to celebrate 50 years of the KTFF, involved national teams from Kosovo and the Sápmi region of northern Scandinavia, and was won by the hosts with maximum points. NF-Board invited Turkish Republic of Northern Cyprus to take part in the first FIFI Wild Cup, held in Hamburg, Germany. This also featured teams from Greenland, Tibet, Gibraltar, Zanzibar, and a team representing "The Republic of St. Pauli", amateur players drawn from the St Pauli district of Hamburg. TRNC defeated Zanzibar on penalties in the final after a goalless draw to lift the trophy. KTFF hosted and won the ELF Cup beating in the final Crimea, in 2006. In 1999 hosted and won the Sport Games Football Association. The only one tournament lost is the 1980 Islamic Games in Turkey, where they lost 2 matches on 4. the team will compete at the 2016 ConIFA World Football Cup

FIFI Wild Cup record

Draws include knockout matches decided on penalty kicks.

ELF Cup record

Competitions record

Izmir Tournament

Northern Cyprus tournament

World Cup record

European Cup record

Players

Current squad
The following players have been called up for the 2021 ConIFA European Football Cup in Nice, from 12 August to 23 August 2021.

Recent call-ups
The following players have been called up for the team within the last 12 months.

Notes
PRE = Preliminary squad.
RET = Retired from international football.
WD  = Withdrew from the squad.
INJ = Withdrew due to an injury.

See also
Sport in Northern Cyprus

References

External links
  HomePage
  All-time results from RSSSF
  "Footballers Reveal ‘Strip’ Poster to Highlight their 50 Year Ban from International Football"
  Details of FIFI Wild Cup final
  Article about the FIFI Wild Cup final
  2006 FIFI Wild Cup Pictures of TRNC Team
  Cyprus Soccer E-Group

 
CONIFA member associations
European N.F.-Board teams
National
European national and official selection-teams not affiliated to FIFA